Russell is an unincorporated hamlet in Bottineau County in the U.S. state of North Dakota.
There are no businesses or services there, only about half a dozen homes scattered along narrow, intersecting dirt roads.

History
Russell was established as a farm post office on August 21, 1901, with the postmaster being Austin C. Russell. The post office was relocated in 1905 one mile to the northeast to the townsite on the Soo Line Railroad. Russell incorporated in 1905, and the town reached the peak population of 161 in 1910. Russell would later decline to a population of 14 in 1970. Russell disincorporated on November 14, 1996.

Geography
Russell is located at  (48.671389, -100.901667).

References

Former municipalities in North Dakota
Unincorporated communities in Bottineau County, North Dakota
Unincorporated communities in North Dakota
Populated places disestablished in 1996
Populated places established in 1905
1905 establishments in North Dakota